Elizabeth Carraway Howland (November 20, 1816July 11, 1886; also Harland or Holland) was a Confederate spy during the American Civil War.

Union soldiers captured her town of New Bern, North Carolina. She made useful medicine for captured Confederate soldiers and helped Confederates smuggle food.

References

1816 births
1886 deaths
American Civil War spies
Female wartime spies
People from New Bern, North Carolina
People of North Carolina in the American Civil War
Women in the American Civil War